Tom Elliot (10 April 1880 – 28 November 1948) was a Scotland international rugby union player.

Rugby Union career

Amateur career

Elliot played for Gala, first playing for the club in 1899.

The Gala 7s side, including Elliot, got to the Hawick Sevens final of 1904, but Hawick beat them in the final. The Hawick News and Border Chronicle of 22 April 1904 noting:
That Gala were kept mostly on the defensive; and Tom Elliot did not get much chance of a sprint.

As runners up, the Gala players were given kit bags.

The Gala XV side won the Border League in 1905.

Elliot was a mainstay in the Gala side until 1909.

Provincial career

He was capped by South of Scotland District. He did not make the side in their 23 December 1905 match against the Anglo-Scots and J. Bunyan of Melrose had to take his place.

He captained the side in their match against South Africa in 1906. W. E. Kyle was chosen captain when the side was first announced, but Kyle could not play.

He played for Provinces District in the 14 January trial match of 1905.

International career

He was capped by Scotland only the once, in 1905, in the match against England.

Family

He was born to William Elliot (1840-1909) and Ann Mair (1843-1921). He was one of their 9 children. He married Gladys Maude Benstead on 28 October 1924 in Surrey.

References

1880 births
1948 deaths
Scottish rugby union players
Scotland international rugby union players
Gala RFC players
South of Scotland District (rugby union) players
Provinces District (rugby union) players
Rugby union players from Galashiels
Rugby union wings